

Results
Arsenal's score comes first

Football League Second Division

Final League table

FA Cup

References

1901-02
English football clubs 1901–02 season